Stagecoach: The Texas Jack Story is a 2016 Canadian western film starring Trace Adkins, Kim Coates and Judd Nelson.  It is based on the life story of outlaw Nathaniel Reed.

Plot

Cast
 Trace Adkins as Nathaniel Reed
 Kim Coates as Calhoun
 Judd Nelson as Sid
 Michelle Harrison as Laura Lee Reed
 Helena Marie as Bonnie Mudd
 Claude Duhamel as Frank Bell
 John Emmet Tracy as Hank Holliday
 Garry Chalk as Doc Forrester
 Greg Rogers as Judge York Foley

References

External links
 
 
 

2016 films
2016 Western (genre) films
2010s biographical films
Canadian Western (genre) films
Canadian biographical films
English-language Canadian films
2010s English-language films
2010s Canadian films